10,000,000 (ten million) is the natural number following 9,999,999 and preceding 10,000,001.

In scientific notation, it is written as 107.

In South Asia except for Sri Lanka, it is known as the crore.

In Cyrillic numerals, it is known as the vran (вран — raven).

Selected 8-digit numbers (10,000,001–99,999,999)

10,000,001 to 19,999,999
 10,000,019 = smallest 8-digit prime number
 10,001,628 = smallest triangular number with 8 digits and the 4,472nd triangular number
 10,004,569 = 31632, the smallest 8-digit square
 10,077,696 = 2163 = 69, the smallest 8-digit cube
 10,556,001 = 32492 = 574
 10,609,137 = Leyland number
 10,976,184 = logarithmic number
 11,111,111 = repunit
 11,316,496 = 33642 = 584
 11,390,625 = 33752 = 2253 = 156
 11,405,773 = Leonardo prime
 11,436,171 = Keith number
 11,485,154 = Markov number
 11,881,376 = 265
 11,943,936 = 34562
 12,117,361 = 34812 = 594
 12,252,240 = highly composite number, smallest number divisible by all the numbers 1 through 18
 12,648,430 = hexadecimal C0FFEE, resembling the word "coffee"; used as a placeholder in computer programming, see hexspeak.
 12,890,625 = 1-automorphic number
 12,960,000 = 36002 = 604 = (3·4·5)4, Plato's "nuptial number" (Republic VIII; see regular number)
 12,988,816 = number of different ways of covering an 8-by-8 square with 32 1-by-2 dominoes
 13,079,255 = number of free 16-ominoes
 13,782,649 = Markov number
 13,845,841 = 37212 = 614
 14,348,907 = 2433 = 275 = 315
 14,352,282 = Leyland number
 14,776,336 = 38442 = 624
 14,930,352 = Fibonacci number
 15,485,863 = 1,000,000th prime number
 15,548,694 = Fine number
 15,752,961 = 39692 = 634
 15,994,428 = Pell number
 16,003,008 = 2523
 16,609,837 = Markov number
 16,733,779 = number of ways to partition {1,2,...,10} and then partition each cell (block) into subcells.
 16,777,216 = 40962 = 2563 = 644 = 166 = 88 = 412 = 224 — hexadecimal "million" (0x1000000), number of possible colors in 24/32-bit Truecolor computer graphics
 16,777,792 = Leyland number
 16,797,952 = Leyland number
 16,964,653 = Markov number
 17,016,602 = index of a prime Woodall number
 17,210,368 = 285
 17,650,828 = 11 + 22 + 33 + 44 + 55 + 66 + 77 + 88
 17,850,625 = 42252 = 654
 18,199,284 = Motzkin number
 18,974,736 = 43562 = 664
 19,487,171 = 117
 19,680,277 = Wedderburn-Etherington number
 19,987,816 = palindromic in 3 consecutive bases: 41AAA1413, 292429214, 1B4C4B115

20,000,000 to 29,999,999
 20,031,170 = Markov number
 20,151,121 = 44892 = 674
 20,511,149 = 295
 20,797,002 = number of triangle-free graphs on 13 vertices
 21,381,376 = 46242 = 684
 21,531,778 = Markov number
 21,621,600 = colossally abundant number, superior highly composite number
 22,222,222 = repdigit
 22,667,121 = 47612 = 694
 24,010,000 = 49002 = 704
 24,137,569 = 49132 = 2893 = 176
 24,157,817 = Fibonacci number, Markov number
 24,300,000 = 305
 24,678,050 = equal to the sum of the eighth powers of its digits
 24,684,612 = 18 + 28 + 38 + 48 + 58 + 68 + 78 + 88 
 24,883,200 = superfactorial of 6
 25,411,681 = 50412 = 714
 26,873,856 = 51842 = 724
 27,644,437 = Bell number
 28,398,241 = 53292 = 734
 28,629,151 = 315
 29,986,576 = 54762 = 744

30,000,000 to 39,999,999
 31,536,000 = standard number of seconds in a non-leap year (omitting leap seconds)
 31,622,400 = standard number of seconds in a leap year (omitting leap seconds)
 31,640,625 = 56252 = 754
 33,333,333 = repdigit
 33,362,176 = 57762 = 764
 33,445,755 = Keith number
 33,550,336 = fifth perfect number
 33,554,432 = 325 = 225, Leyland number, number of directed graphs on 5 labeled nodes
 33,555,057 = Leyland number
 34,012,224 = 58322 = 3243 = 186
 35,153,041 = 59292 = 774
 35,831,808 = 127 = 10,000,00012 AKA a dozen-great-great-gross (1012 great-great-grosses)
 36,614,981 = alternating factorial
 36,926,037 = 3333
 37,015,056 = 60842 = 784
 37,259,704 = 3343
 37,595,375 = 3353
 37,933,056 = 3363
 38,613,965 = Pell number, Markov number
 38,950,081 = 62412 = 794
 39,088,169 = Fibonacci number
 39,135,393 = 335
 39,905,269 = number of square (0,1)-matrices without zero rows and with exactly 8 entries equal to 1
 39,916,800 = 11!
 39,916,801 = factorial prime

40,000,000 to 49,999,999
 40,353,607 = 3433 = 79
 40,960,000 = 64002 = 804
 43,046,721 = 65612 = 814 = 98 = 316
 43,050,817 = Leyland number
 43,112,609 = Mersenne prime exponent
 43,443,858 = palindromic in 3 consecutive bases: 3C323C315, 296E69216, 1DA2AD117
 43,484,701 = Markov number
 44,121,607 = Keith number
 44,444,444 = repdigit
 45,136,576 = Leyland number
 45,212,176 = 67242 = 822
 45,435,424 = 345
 46,026,618 = Wedderburn-Etherington number
 46,656,000 = 3603
 46,749,427 = number of partially ordered set with 11 unlabeled elements
 47,045,881 = 68592 = 3613 = 196
 47,326,700 = first number of the first consecutive centuries each consisting wholly of composite numbers
 47,326,800 = first number of the first century with the same prime pattern (in this case, no primes) as the previous century
 47,458,321 = 68892 = 834
 48,024,900 = square triangular number
 48,828,125 = 511
 48,928,105 = Markov number
 48,989,176 = Leyland number
 49,787,136 = 70562 = 844

50,000,000 to 59,999,999
 50,107,909 = number of free 17-ominoes
 50,847,534 = The number of primes under 109
 50,852,019 = Motzkin number
 52,200,625 = 72252 = 854
 52,521,875 = 355
 54,700,816 = 73962 = 864
 55,555,555 = repdigit
 57,048,048 = Fine number
 57,289,761 = 75692 = 874
 57,885,161 = Mersenne prime exponent
 59,969,536 = 77442 = 884

60,000,000 to 69,999,999
 60,466,176 = 77762 = 365 = 610
 61,466,176 = Leyland number
 62,742,241 = 79212 = 894
 62,748,517 = 137
 63,245,986 = Fibonacci number, Markov number
 64,000,000 = 80002 = 4003 = 206 — vigesimal "million" (1 alau in Mayan, 1  in Nahuatl)
 65,610,000 = 81002 = 904
 66,600,049 = Largest minimal prime in base 10
 66,666,666 = repdigit
 67,108,864 = 81922 = 413 = 226
 67,109,540 = Leyland number
 67,137,425 = Leyland number
 68,041,019 = number of parallelogram polyominoes with 23 cells.
 68,574,961 = 82812 = 914
 69,343,957 = 375

70,000,000 to 79,999,999
 71,639,296 = 84642 = 924
 72,546,283 = the smallest prime number preceded and followed by prime gaps of over 100
 73,939,133 = the largest prime number that can be 'tailed' again and again by removing its last digit to produce only primes
 74,207,281 = Mersenne prime exponent
 74,805,201 = 86492 = 934
 77,232,917 = Mersenne prime exponent
 77,777,777 = repdigit
 78,074,896 = 88362 = 944
 78,442,645 = Markov number
 79,235,168 = 385

80,000,000 to 89,999,999
 81,450,625 = 90252 = 954
 82,589,933 = Mersenne prime exponent
 84,934,656 = 92162 = 964
 85,766,121 = 92612 = 4413 = 216
 86,400,000 = hyperfactorial of 5; 11 × 22 × 33 × 44 × 55
 87,109,376 = 1-automorphic number
 87,539,319 = taxicab number
 88,529,281 = 94092 = 974
 88,888,888 = repdigit

90,000,000 to 99,999,999
 90,224,199 = 395
 92,236,816 = 96042 = 984
 93,222,358 = Pell number
 93,554,688 = 2-automorphic number
 94,109,401 = square pentagonal number
 94,418,953 = Markov prime
 96,059,601 = 98012 = 994
 99,897,344 = 4643, the largest 8-digit cube
 99,980,001 = 99992, the largest 8-digit square
 99,990,001 = unique prime
 99,991,011 = largest triangular number with 8 digits and the 14,141st triangular number
 99,999,989 = greatest prime number with 8 digits
 99,999,999 = repdigit, Friedman number, believed to be smallest number to be both repdigit and Friedman

See also 
Hebdometre

References 

 
Integers